Cystoderma chocoanum is a species of mushroom in the family Agaricaceae. Described as new to science in 1993, it was originally found in the tropical lowlands of Colombia, growing on decaying wood. The specific epithet chocoanum refers to the Department of Chocó in Colombia. It has also been reported from Brazil.

References

External links

Agaricaceae
Fungi of Brazil
Fungi of Colombia
Fungi described in 1993